The Istria Cup is an annual invitational women's football tournament, hosted by Croatia since 2013, in the Istria region of Croatia. It is held at the same time of the year as the Algarve Cup, the Arnold Clark Cup, the Cup of Nations, the Cyprus Women's Cup, the Pinatar Cup, the SheBelieves Cup, the Tournoi de France, the Turkish Women's Cup and the Women's Revelations Cup. The format of competition varies from year to year.

History

References

     
International women's association football invitational tournaments
International association football competitions hosted by Croatia
Women's football in Croatia
Recurring sporting events established in 2013
2013 establishments in Croatia